Terry Lyle Hanson is a Canadian politician who the Member of the Legislative Assembly of Saskatchewan for Qu'Appelle-Wolseley from 1971 to 1975.

References 

Living people
20th-century Canadian politicians
Saskatchewan New Democratic Party MLAs
Year of birth missing (living people)